Leonard Robinson is an American actor, comedian, writer and performer.

Early life 
Leonard Robinson was born in Cleveland, Ohio, and raised in Danbury, Connecticut. He is a 1994 graduate of Danbury High School, where he was a Class LL state champion wrestler. Robinson gained early inspiration to pursue acting from watching Sesame Street.

Education 
Robinson attended Howard University, where he graduated with a business degree in Management Information Systems. He took his first formal acting courses while attending Howard.

Career 
After graduating from Howard University, Robinson worked as a tech consultant, and later moved to New York City to pursue roles in theater and stand-up. In the mid-2000s he moved to Los Angeles. His television debut was on the MTV’s improv game show, Wild ‘n Out, where he would perform over the course of four seasons as an original cast member with comedians such as Katt Williams and Randall Park.

Robinson also appeared in theaters nationwide including "The Exonerated" at The Culture Project (Off-Broadway), Williamstown Theatre Festival, New York Fringe Festival, and Studio Theatre in Washington, DC. He later studied improv at the world-famous Upright Citizen’s Brigade Theatre and IO West and was a participant in the NBC Stand-Up for Diversity.

As a writer, Leonard developed the treatment for Lil Jon and LMFAO’s “Drink” music video, which has over 7 million views on YouTube alone. In 2019, Leonard was selected to participate in the prestigious CBS Diversity Sketch Comedy Showcase as part of their first writer’s room. Today, Leonard is a main company member at The Groundlings where he writes, directs, and performs. He is also a regular at The World Famous Comedy Store, and has performed his stand-up abroad throughout the U.K.

In 2018, Robinson joined the cast of Insecure in its third season as Taurean, a role he would continue into the show's final season. Robinson had auditioned for multiple roles in Insecure, including Lawrence in the show's pilot, before being cast as Taurean. He was chosen directly by show runner Prentice Penny for the role.

Filmography

Film and TV Movies

Television

References

External links 
Official Website

Year of birth missing (living people)
Living people
African-American male actors
People from Cleveland
American male comedians
American male film actors
American male television actors
21st-century American male actors
People from Danbury, Connecticut
Male actors from Connecticut
21st-century American comedians